Vevey railway station is a public transport hub not far from the shore of Lake Geneva. It serves the municipality of Vevey, in the Canton of Vaud, Switzerland.

SBB-CFF-FFS passenger trains call here while operating on the lakeside section of the standard gauge Simplon railway line. The station is also the western terminus of the standard gauge Chemin de fer Vevey-Chexbres to Puidoux-Chexbres on the Olten–Lausanne railway line, and a metre gauge line from Vevey to Blonay and Les Pléiades.

History

Vevey station was opened on 2 April 1861, when the then Jura–Simplon Railway (JS) opened the Lausanne–Villeneuve section of its standard gauge Simplon railway line to Sion.  This line is now owned and operated by SBB-CFF-FFS.

In 1902, operations began on the present day Transports Montreux–Vevey–Riviera metre gauge line to Blonay and Les Pléiades.  In 1904, the line to Châtel-Saint-Denis, also metre gauge, became available for traffic.  In the same year, the standard gauge Chemin de fer Vevey–Chexbres (VCh) line was opened to link Vevey with Puidoux-Chexbres.

The metre gauge line to Chatel-Saint-Denis was closed in 1969 and was replaced by VMCV bus line 13.

Location
In the immediate vicinity can be found the Centre Saint-Antoine and Midi-Coindet shopping centres, which combine to form one of the largest shopping facilities in western Switzerland. Next to the station, in the old post office building, is the Coop Pronto office, amongst others.

Layout
As at the nearby Montreux railway station, access to the main platform is from the first floor of the station building, instead of the ground floor. The track system comprises one side and two centre platforms, along with some goods tracks.

Tracks 1 and 3 are reserved for SBB-CFF-FFS traffic on the Simplon railway line (there is no track 2).

Track 5, which is located with track 3 and the short track 4 on one of the centre platforms, serves the Train des Vignes as S31 to Puidoux-Chexbres.

The other centre platform, with tracks 6 (standard gauge) and 7 (metre gauge), which is in the western part of a small curve, usually serves only the MVR traffic to Blonay and Les Pléiades.

Services 
 the following services call at Vevey:

Swiss Federal Railways 
 RegioExpress:
On weekends, hourly service to Geneva Airport.

RER Vaud 
 RER Vaud:

Transports Montreux–Vevey–Riviera 

Bus service

The VMCV serves the station (Vevey Gare) with various lines:

 Line 201 (a trolleybus line): Vevey Funi–Vevey Gare–La Tour-de-Peilz–Montreux–Chillon–Villeneuve
 Line 202: Vevey Gare–Crosets–Gilamont–Entre deux Villes–Vevey Gare
 Line 211: Vevey–Corsier–Corseaux
 Line 212: Vevey–Funiculaire–Corsier–Nant/Fenil Vieille Rte.
 Line 213: Vevey–Châtel-Saint-Denis/Bossonnens

References

External links
 
 

Railway stations in the canton of Vaud
Swiss Federal Railways stations
Railway station
Railway stations in Switzerland opened in 1861